Conyza ramosissima, the dwarf horseweed, is a species of North American plants in the family Asteraceae. It is widespread and common across the central part of the United States, its range extending from New Mexico east to Alabama and north as far as Pennsylvania, Ontario, and North Dakota.

The oldest name for the species is Erigeron divaricatus, coined in 1803 and still used by some sources. Moving the species to Conyza required a change in epithet to avoid a conflict with the name Conyza divaricata Spreng.,  used for a South American plant in 1826. Hence the new name Conyza ramosissima.

Conyza ramosissima is a much-branching annual herb sometimes growing to a height of 25 cm (10 inches) or more. Its leaves are small and thread-like. It has numerous small flower heads, each with white or lavender ray florets and yellow disc florets. The plant is most often found in disturbed sites such as fields, roadsides, etc.

References

Astereae
Flora of Eastern Canada
Flora of the Northeastern United States
Flora of the United States
Flora of the Southeastern United States
Flora of New Mexico
Flora of the Great Plains (North America)
Plants described in 1803
Taxa named by André Michaux
Medicinal plants of North America
Flora without expected TNC conservation status